Chilperic II (c. 672 – 13 February 721), known as Daniel prior to his coronation, was the youngest son of Childeric II and his half-cousin wife, Bilichild. He reigned as king of Neustria from 715 and sole king of the Franks from 718 until his death.

As an infant, he was spirited to a monastery to protect his life from the internecine feuding of his family.  There, he was raised as Daniel until the death of Dagobert III in 715, when he was taken from the monastery – at the age of forty-three – and raised on the shield of the Neustrian warriors as king, as was the custom. He took the royal name of Chilperic, though due to his monastic upbringing, he was a very different man from Chilperic I.

First, it appears he was supposed to be but a tool in the hands of Ragenfrid, the mayor of the palace of Neustria, acclaimed in 714 in opposition to Theudoald, Pepin of Heristal's designated heir.  Chilperic, however, was his own man: both a fighter and a leader, always at the forefront in battle at the head of his troops.  In 716, he and Ragenfrid together led an army into Austrasia, then being warred over by Plectrude, on behalf of her grandson Theudoald, and Charles Martel, the son of Pepin of Heristal.  The Neustrians allied with another invading force under Radbod, King of the Frisians and met Charles in battle near Cologne, then held by Plectrude.  Chilperic was victorious and Charles fled to the mountains of the Eifel.  The king and his mayor then turned to besiege their other rival in the city.  Plectrude acknowledged Chilperic as king, gave over the Austrasian treasury, and abandoned her grandson's claim to the mayoralty.

At this juncture, events took a turn against Chilperic.  As he and Ragenfrid were leading their triumphant soldiers back to Neustria, Charles fell on them near Malmedy and in the Battle of Amblève, Charles routed them and they fled.  Thereafter, Charles Martel remained virtually undefeated and Chilperic's strong will was subdued in a series of campaigns waged in Neustrian territory.

In 717, Charles returned to Neustria with an army and confirmed his supremacy with a victory at Vincy, near Cambrai.  He chased the fleeing king and mayor to Paris before turning back to deal with Plectrude and Cologne.  On succeeding there, Charles Martel immediately proclaimed Chlothar IV king of Austrasia in opposition to Chilperic.  In 718, Chilperic, in response, allied with Odo the Great, the duke of Aquitaine who had made himself independent during the contests in 715, but he was again defeated by Charles, at Soissons in 718.  King Chilperic II fled with his ducal ally Odo to the land south of the Loire and his mayor Ragenfrid fled to Angers.  Soon Chlothar IV died in 718, which might be a suspicious death. Duke Odo then handed over Chilperic II to Charles Martel and, in exchange for Charles recognising Chilperic's kingship over all the Franks, the king surrendered his political power to Charles, whom he recognized as Mayor over all the kingdoms (718).

In 719, Chilperic II was officially raised on the shield as King of all the Franks, but he survived but a year and his successors were mere rois fainéants.  He died in Attigny and was buried in Noyon. Chilperic II may have been the father of Childeric III, but this remains uncertain.

References

Sources
Oman, Charles. The Dark Ages, 476–918. London: Rivingtons, 1914.

External links
From Merovingians to Carolingians: Dynastic Change in Frankia.

Merovingian kings
Frankish warriors
672 births
721 deaths
Burials at Saint-Germain-des-Prés (abbey)
8th-century Frankish kings